FKF may refer to:

Fast Kalman filter
Football Kenya Federation
Free Knowledge Foundation, in Spain
Fylkeskommunalt foretak, a county-municipal business enterprise in Norway
Libertarian Municipal People, a Swedish political party